The 2022 season was St Patrick's Athletic F.C.'s 93rd year in existence and was the Supersaint's 71st consecutive season in the top-flight of Irish football. It was the first season in charge for manager Tim Clancy, having taken over from Stephen O'Donnell in December 2021. Pre-season training for the squad began in December 2021. The fixtures were released on 20 December 2021, with Pat's down to play rivals Shelbourne on the opening night of the season. In addition to the league and defence of their FAI Cup title, the club also competed in the UEFA Europa Conference League and the President of Ireland's Cup.

Squad

Transfers

Transfers in

Transfers out

Squad statistics

Appearances, goals and cards
Number in brackets represents (appearances of which were substituted ON).
Last updated – 6 November 2022

Top scorers
Includes all competitive matches.
Last updated 6 November 2022

Top assists
Includes all competitive matches.
Last updated 6 November 2022

Top clean sheets
Includes all competitive matches.
Last updated 6 November 2022

Disciplinary record
Last updated 6 November 2022

Captains

Club

Coaching staff
First-team manager: Tim Clancy
Assistant manager: Jon Daly
Technical director: Alan Mathews
Director of football: Ger O'Brien
Coach: Seán O'Connor
Opposition analyst: Martin Doyle
Goalkeeping coach: Pat Jennings
Strength and conditioning coach: Chris Colburn
Head of medical: Sam Rice
Club doctor: Dr Matt Corcoran
Physiotherapist: Christy O'Neill
Equipment manager: David McGill
Academy director: Ger O'Brien
Assistant academy director: Jamie Moore
Academy lead strength and conditioning coach: Seán Fogarty
Head of academy medical: David Mugalu
Head of academy recruitment: Ian Cully
Head of academy data: Phil Power
Under 19s manager: Seán O'Connor
Under 19s assistant manager: Niall Cully
Under 19s coach: Paul Webb
Under 19s goalkeeping coach: Seán Fogarty
Under 17s manager: John Donohue
Under 17s goalkeeping coach: Seán Fogarty
Under 15s manager: Alan Brady
Under 15s assistant manager: Willie Tyrell
Under 15s coach: Ciarán Creagh
Under 15s goalkeeping coach: Jamie Quinn
Under 14s manager: Mark Connolly
Under 14s assistant manager: Dan Tannim
Under 14s goalkeeping coach: Alex Regan

Kit

|
|
|
|}

The club released new Home & Away kits for the season.

Key:LOI=League of Ireland Premier DivisionFAI=FAI CupUEC=UEFA Europa Conference LeaguePRC=President of Ireland's CupFRN=Friendly

Competitions

League of Ireland

League table

Results summary

Results by round

Matches

FAI Cup

First round

UEFA Europa Conference League

Second qualifying round

Third qualifying round

President of Ireland's Cup

Friendlies

Pre-season

Mid-season

References

2022
2022 League of Ireland Premier Division by club